Hantzschia amphioxys is a species of diatom belonging to the family Bacillariaceae.

It has cosmopolitan distribution.

References

Bacillariales